Miriam Escofet (born 1967) is a Spanish portrait painter who lives and works in London.

Early life and education
Miriam Escofet was born in 1967 in Barcelona, the daughter of Josep Escofet, and moved to the United Kingdom in 1979. She studied at Epsom School of Art and graduated in 3D Design from Brighton School of Art in 1991 and has been working as an artist ever since. Escofet is fluent in three languages – Spanish, Catalan, and English.

Career
Since 2011 she has taught art and portrait painting at Central Saint Martin's School of Art and Design in London and, since 2010, at Heatherleys School of Fine Art. Her work is dedicated to her influences on the architecture of the classical, Gothic and Renaissance periods. She has become very known for her style of painting. She has exhibited widely in Europe. Her work has been selected for the BP Portrait Award exhibitions in 2009, 2010 and 2012 and for the Royal Society of Portrait Painters annual exhibition.

Her artworks have featured in galleries such as Christopher Wood Gallery, Mallet of Bond Street, Rafael Vals, Duke Street, and the Albemarle Gallery.  She has numerous of solo exhibitions as well. She is an associate member at the Royal Society of Portrait Painters. Escofet's artwork become the cover of books, magazines, and flyers. Her artwork Order of Caryatids became the cover of Clavis Journal Volume 3 book. She has published two books with her father, Josep Escofet.

Escofet has done four solo exhibitions. Her first solo was in 2001 at the Albemarle Gallery in London. The others were in 2005 and 2007 at the Galerie Michelle Boulet in Paris, and in 2008, again at the Albemarle Gallery. She has had two exhibitions with her father, Josep Escofet, in 2010 and in 2011 at Villa Beretelli, Italy. Her artwork is commonly found in the Albemarle Gallery. Her debut was in 1999 at the Annual Still Life and Trompe Show. In 2000, she was part of the millennium art show. In 2006, she was in the tenth anniversary show. In 2010, she was in the Art of Charity show. In 2011, her work was featured for the summer collective. As part of the Royal Society of Portrait Painters, her artwork featured in the annual exhibition. She has  been featured in four of the annual exhibitions.

She was commissioned by the Foreign and Commonwealth Office to paint a portrait of Queen Elizabeth II, which was unveiled in 2020.

Awards 
BP Portrait Award 2018
BP Portrait Award 2012, NPG Publications
BP Portrait Award 2010, NPG Publications
BP Portrait Award 2009, NPG Publications
BP Portrait Award 2007, NPG Publications

References

Sources

External links 
 
 NPG 2018 Portrait Award winner
 NPG 2012
 NPG 2009
 NPG 2010
 The Royal Society of Portrait Painters

1967 births
Living people
20th-century Spanish painters
20th-century Spanish women artists
21st-century Spanish painters
21st-century Spanish women artists
Academics of Central Saint Martins
Alumni of the University of Brighton
Women artists from Catalonia
Painters from Barcelona
Royal Society of Portrait Painters
Spanish portrait painters
Spanish people of English descent